"Hear Me Out" may refer to:


Television
Hear Me Out (TV series), a Singaporean info-ed TV series

Music

Albums
Hear Me Out, a 2001 solo piano album by Don Preston
Hear Me Out, a 2009 album by Loïs Lane
Hear Me Out, an album by VanVelzen, sequel to Take Me In
Hear Me Out, a 2006 album by The Joel Streeter Band with Jerry Becker

Songs
"Hear Me Out", song by Infinity, which peaked at number twelve in Norway
"Hear Me Out", song by Irma from Faces
"Hear Me Out", single by Lowe
"Hear Me Out", song by Scuba Dice EP 2
"Hear Me Out", song by Ben Kweller from On My Way
"Hear Me Out", song by Frou Frou
"Hear Me Out", song by Hidden in Plain View from Resolution
"Hear Me Out", song by Girls Aloud from What Will the Neighbours Say?
"Hear Me Out", song by Don Cannon
"Hear Me Out", song by Silverstein
"Hear Me Out", song by Go Radio from their 2012 album Close the Distance
"Hear Me Out", 1988 song by Vengeance
"Hear Me Out", song by Close to Home